Lucky Fonz III (born in 1981 as Otto Wichers) is a Dutch singer-songwriter from Nijmegen, Netherlands.

History
Wichers studied at the University of Amsterdam when he recorded his first titleless album in 2005. After winning the Grote Prijs van Nederland in the category  singer-songwriter, Lucky Fonz III received more media attention. In 2007 the second album, called Life is short was released. In 2008 he did a serie of monthly live performances at VARA's De Wereld Draait Door, a Dutch talkshow on Nederland 3. In 2009 he did his first US tour including a performance at SxSW. In 2009 A family like yours. The single Ik heb een meisje entered the Dutch charts in May 2010 and is a precursor of the new album Hoe je honing maakt, which was released on 8 October 2010.

Discography

Albums
 Lucky Fonz III, 2005		
 Life is short, 2007
 A family like yours, 2009
 Hoe je honing maakt, 2010
 All of Amsterdam, 2013
 In je nakie, 2016
 Multimens, 2019

Singles
 Ik heb een meisje, 2010
 Diana, 2011
 Zondag, 2017

External links
Lucky Fonz III – Official site

Musical groups from Nijmegen